Alpha Omega Epsilon is a social and professional sorority for women in engineering and technical sciences. The sorority was founded by twenty-seven female engineering students at Marquette University on November 13, 1983, and four months later on March 22, 1984, it became a recognized organization on the Marquette University campus. The idea of uniting female engineers and technical scientists of all curricula as Alpha Omega Epsilon has spread to other campuses. As a result, there are currently forty-eight active chapters of the sorority. Alpha Omega Epsilon enjoys a close working relationship with its male counterpart, Sigma Phi Delta (ΣΦΔ).

Alpha Omega Epsilon is a member of the Professional Fraternity Association at the international level; however, several of its chapters are members of their local Panhellenic Councils.

Purpose of Alpha Omega Epsilon
Alpha Omega Epsilon promotes ideals and objectives to help further the advancement of female engineers and technical scientists, while at the same time encouraging bonds of lifelong friendships among members. Alpha Omega Epsilon members value "friendship, leadership, and professionalism."

Friendship lies at the heart of every activity in which Alpha Omega Epsilon members participate.

Leadership opportunities at the chapter and international levels are available to Alpha Omega Epsilon members.

Professionalism is integral to promoting the purpose of Alpha Omega Epsilon; the sorority is dedicated to educating the community on the importance of women in technical fields and encouraging young women to pursue technical careers.

Sorority history

1980–1990 
In the early 1980s, the Little Sisters of both Sigma Phi Delta and Triangle Fraternity at Marquette University, started meeting in hopes of forming an organization to increase the number of women in engineering. They decided to form a sorority, and Alpha Omega Epsilon was founded by 27 female engineering students on November 13, 1983.  The first Alpha Chapter candidate class was initiated in the fall of 1984.

1990–2000 

In 1990 the National Executive Board (NEB), the governing body for the future national organization, is founded by four members of the Sorority from the Alpha and Beta chapters: Cindy Majcher (Alpha), Kathy Rectenwald (Alpha), Julie Whalen (Alpha), and Michelle Rohr (Beta). The NEB was composed of the Executive Director, Expansion Officer, Financial Officer, and Interchapter Relations Officer. Cynthia Majcher (Alpha) was elected the first Executive Director. In 1991, procedures to incorporate the organization in the state of Wisconsin began, and the national organization’s Constitution and Bylaws were drafted. Additionally, local Sorority Alpha Sigma Kappa at the University of Minnesota at Minneapolis was established as the Epsilon Prospective chapter. During this time the Sorority’s scope increased from solely promoting women in engineering to promoting women in both engineering and technical sciences.

In 1992 the NEB’s structure was changed, and the President assumed the role of the Executive Director, the Vice President assumed the role of the Expansion Officer, the Treasurer assumed the role of the Financial Officer, and the Secretary assumed the role of the Interchapter Relations Officer. The first National Convention was held in Rapid City, SD during the summer of 1992 with the Alpha, Beta, and Gamma chapters in attendance. In late 1992 the Epsilon Prospective chapter withdrew its intent to join Alpha Omega Epsilon, and the NEB decided to join the Professional Fraternity Association (PFA).

In 1993 the National Constitution and Bylaws were ratified and a decision was made to incorporate as a social organization, rendering the Sorority both a social and professional organization (due to the NEB’s affiliation with the PFA). The Articles of Incorporation for Alpha Omega Epsilon, Inc. were filed with the Secretary of State in Wisconsin.

In 1994 a proposal to start a National Foundation – whose goals were to establish academic, professional, leadership, and volunteer development programs including scholarships, conference attendance/sponsorship, and grants – was initiated. In November of that same year, the Sorority’s Risk Management Policy was finalized, and Alpha Omega Epsilon, Inc. received 501(c)(7) designation as a tax-exempt organization from the Internal Revenue Service (IRS).

In 1996, the NEB’s structure was changed for a second time to add a fifth office – the Interchapter Relations Officer – whose duties included overseeing the activities of the chapters. This allowed the Secretary to focus more on Sorority history and risk management. On December 5, 1996, the Alpha Omega Epsilon National Foundation, a non-profit organization that primarily focuses on academic development programs, professional and leadership development programs, volunteer development programs, and organizational grants, is established by four members of the Sorority from the Alpha chapter and the Beta chapter: Cindy Benske (Alpha), Julie Whalen (Alpha), Julie Heinrich (Beta), and Michelle Vondenkamp (Beta). Cindy Benske is selected the first Chairman of the Alpha Omega Epsilon National Foundation Board of Directors.

On February 21, 1998, Eta chapter was installed at the University of British Columbia in Vancouver, British Columbia marking the first international chapter of the Sorority. In March of that same year, the Alpha Omega Epsilon National Foundation received 501(c)(3) designation as a tax-exempt charitable organization from the IRS, retroactive to the date of founding.

On December 4, 1999, a prospective chapter of Alpha Omega Epsilon was established at Trine University in Angola, IN.

2000–2010 

In April 2000, the Iota chapter of Alpha Omega Epsilon was founded at the University of Michigan-Dearborn.

In November 2000, a prospective chapter petition was received from Rutgers University, but additional members were needed in the interest group before the petition could be approved.

During the summer of 2001, a constitutional change was approved which changed references in the National Constitution and Bylaws from “national” to “international” to recognize the Sorority’s status as an international organization due to the installation of the Eta Chapter at the University of British Columbia in Vancouver, British Columbia, Canada. In conjunction with this change, the NEB became the International Executive Board (IEB). Immediately following the 2001 convention, the General Liability and Directors and Officers Liability insurance policies were first purchased for the Sorority.

In April 2002, the Trine Prospective Chapter was disbanded due to low membership numbers.

In February 2003 the Degree Recognition Committee was formed as a joint effort between the Sorority and the National Foundation to ensure that all technical science majors accepted for admission into the Sorority qualified for the scholarships the National Foundation awards to engineers and technical scientists. The National Foundation opened its Rings of Excellence Scholarships to Sorority members (and their families) in Canada.

In 2004, the Trine Prospective chapter was re-established at Trine University in Angola, IN on February 14. During the 2004 Convention, the International Executive Board structure was modified to include a sixth position, the Alumnae Relations Officer (ARO), whose main responsibilities included the creation and oversight of Alumnae chapters. The first ARO was appointed in January of the following year.

In 2005, the Bradley University Prospective chapter was established on November 12. The 2005 convention was held in Vancouver, BC, Canada, marking the first convention in an international location. Following the PFA Conference in September, the Sorority’s domain name was changed from www.aoesorority.org to www.alphaomegaepsilon.org to be in line with the domain names of other Greek Sororities and Fraternities.

On February 26, 2006, the Trine Prospective chapter was disbanded for a second time due to low membership numbers. Also in February of that year, the Kappa chapter was deactivated due to waning membership. The 2006 Convention was held jointly with Sigma Phi Delta Engineering Fraternity in Chicago, IL. During that convention the IEB structure was changed again to modify the duties of the Vice President to include outreach to other Greek and Engineering Organizations and learning the duties of the President, to transfer the Vice President duty of expansion to the Director of Expansion, and to add the Director of Publications to oversee all of the Sorority’s publications including the website, newsletter, and standardization of materials. Regions and Regional Advisors were added to the Interchapter Relations Officer’s (ICR) realm of responsibility. Each Chapter was placed into a region to be overseen directly by a Regional Advisor (RA), with RAs reporting directly to the ICR.

In February 2007, the Bradley Prospective chapter was disbanded due to waning membership.

On April 16, 2007 tragedy struck both the Virginia Tech campus and the Sorority. Virginia Tech Prospective chapter Founder, Maxine Turner (Max), was killed during the Virginia Tech Massacre while sitting in her German class in Norris Hall. Max was an honors student from Vienna, VA set to graduate with a Bachelor of Science degree in chemical engineering just one month later in May 2007.  In honor and remembrance of the Sorority's fallen Sister, the National Foundation established the Maxine Shelley Turner Memorial Scholarship, and the Rho chapter created a philanthropic event called Take it to the Max.

On March 8, 2008, the first Alumnae chapter was activated as the Alumnae chapter of the Delta chapter of Alpha Omega Epsilon. On November 13, 2008, the Sorority celebrated its milestone 25th AnniversaryXX. A weekend of activities in Milwaukee, WI was attended by actives and alumnae from eleven chapters across the United States.

The Sorority launched its newly redesigned website in January 2009. At the 2009 convention, the IEB presented the Sorority’s strategic plan which laid the groundwork for the long-term goals of the Sorority.

2010–Present 
On April 24, 2010, the Sorority's first double-lettered chapter, Beta Alpha chapter, was installed at Texas Tech University in Lubbock, TX.

Chapters and Prospective Chapters 
Chapter and prospective chapter information.

Chapters

Notable Alpha Omega Epsilon sisters 
Maxine Shelly Turner, Chemical Engineering student and Rho Chapter Founding Member, was killed in the Virginia Tech Massacre.

See also 

 Professional fraternities and sororities

References 

3.AOE Celebrates 25 Years of Engineering Sisterhood
4.Maxine Shelly Turner Memorial Scholarship Fund
5.Philanthropy. Take it to the MAX
6.Virginia Tech. Turner 
7.Biographies. Maxine Shelly Turner
9.Alpha Omega Epsilon National Foundation Retrieved April 23, 2011
10.Alpha Omega Epsilon Retrieved April 23, 2011

Student organizations established in 1983
Professional fraternities and sororities in the United States
Professional Fraternity Association
1983 establishments in Wisconsin